Daniel Hosler O'Brien (born November 23, 1947 in Findlay, Ohio) is an American author, wildlife biologist, and rancher.

Biography
Dan O'Brien was born in Findlay, Ohio on November 23, 1947. He attended Findlay High School and graduated in 1966. He went to Michigan Technological University to play football and graduated with a BS degree in Math and Business from Findlay College in 1970 where he was the chairman of the first campus Earth Day. He earned an MA in English Literature from the University of South Dakota in 1973 where he studied under Frederick Manfred. He earned an MFA from Bowling Green State University in 1974, worked as a biologist and wrote for a few years before entering the PhD program at Denver University. When he won the prestigious Iowa Short Fiction in 1986 he gave up academics except for occasional short term teaching jobs. O'Brien continued to write and work as an endangered species biologist for the South Dakota Department of Game Fish and Parks and later the Peregrine Fund. In the late 1990s he began to convert his small cattle ranch in South Dakota to a buffalo ranch. In 2001, he founded Wild Idea Buffalo Company and Sustainable Harvest Alliance to produce large landscape, grass-fed and field-harvest buffalo to supply high quality and sustainable buffalo meat to people interested in human health and the health of the American Great Plains. He now raises buffalo and lives on the Cheyenne River Ranch in western South Dakota with his wife Jill. Dan O'Brien is the winner of the Iowa Short Fiction Award, two National Endowment for the Arts Grants for fiction, A Bush Foundation Award for writing, a Spur Award, two Wrangler Awards from the National cowboy Hall of Fame, and an honorary PhD from the University of South Dakota. His books have been translated into seven foreign languages and his essays, reviews, and short stories have been published in many periodicals including, Redbook, New York Times Magazine, FYI. New York Times Book Review.

Bibliography

Short fiction 
 Eminent Domain, 1987

Novels 
 Spirit of the Hills, 1988
 In the Center of the Nation, 1991
 Brendan Prairie, 1996
 The Contract Surgeon: A Novel, 1999
 The Indian Agent: A Novel, 2004
 Stolen Horses, 2010

Memoirs 
 The Rites of Autumn: a Falconer's Journey Across the American West, 1988
 Equinox: Life, Loves, and Birds of Prey, 1997
 Buffalo for The Broken Heart, 2001
 Wild Idea: Buffalo and Family in a Difficult Land, 2014

Essays 
 Great Plains (with Michael Forsberg), 2009
Great Plains Bison, 2017

References

Living people
1947 births
People from Findlay, Ohio
People from South Dakota
20th-century American novelists
21st-century American novelists
American male novelists
American autobiographers
20th-century American male writers
21st-century American male writers
20th-century American non-fiction writers
21st-century American non-fiction writers
American male non-fiction writers
Bowling Green State University alumni
Findlay High School alumni